Gregory W. Becker (born ) is an American business executive who has served as the CEO of SVB Financial Group since 2011. He also served as the final CEO of Silicon Valley Bank (SVB) and a board member of the Federal Reserve Bank of San Francisco before SVB’s collapse in 2023.

Early life and education 
Becker grew up on his family's  farm in Fort Wayne, Indiana. He received a bachelor's degree in finance from the Kelley School of Business at Indiana University.

Career 
Becker's first job out of college was at a Comerica branch in Detroit. Initially, the bank's records erroneously showed that he held a Master of Business Administration; he corrected the error, but it opened up opportunities for him. His manager offered him an opportunity to spend nine months working in the bank's branch in Pleasanton, California. Drawn by the weather, he stayed and worked at a small bank that Comerica had acquired in San Jose.

In 1993, Becker followed his manager to Silicon Valley Bank (SVB). One of his first deals as a loan officer there was to lend $350,000 to a company that would get acquired by Cisco for $. In 1996, he opened the bank's branch in Boulder, Colorado. In 1999, he returned to Silicon Valley to found SVB Capital, the group's venture capital fund management division. He rose through the ranks to become the bank's chief banking officer, chief operating officer, and, in 2008, its president. He was promoted to president of parent company SVB Financial Group in 2010, then became the CEO of both companies on April 21, 2011.

Silicon Valley Bank failure 

Following news of SVB's dire financial circumstances on March 9, 2023, Becker urged venture capitalist firms to avoid panic in order to stave off a collapse. Following news of SVB's failure on March 10, 2023, Becker was reportedly no longer on the board of the Federal Reserve Bank of San Francisco.

On February 27, 2023, Becker sold 12,451 shares of company stock, worth a total of $3.6 million. The sale was made through an executive trading plan filed with the U.S. Securities and Exchange Commission on January 26, 2023. Following SVB's collapse, Becker received criticism from Senator Elizabeth Warren, Representative Ro Khanna of California, and Mayor Matt Mahan of San Jose, who called for money from the stock sale to be clawed back and given to depositors.

Affiliations 

Becker serves on the West Coast Advisory Board of the Johnson Center for Entrepreneurship & Innovation at the Kelley School of Business and, since 2021, the Guiding Council of One Mind at Work, a group that advocates for workplace mental health.

Until the collapse of Silicon Valley Bank in March 2023, Becker represented the bank in several organizations, including trade groups that supported the bank's business agenda. He served as a Class A Director of the Federal Reserve Bank of San Francisco from January 2019; the executive council of the TechNet trade association from 2016, including as chair from 2020 to 2022; and the Silicon Valley Leadership Group's executive board from 2011, including as chair from 2014 to 2017. He also served on the executive advisory board of the Alliance for Southern California Innovation from 2017 to 2018 and on the United States Department of Commerce's Digital Economy Board of Advisors from 2016 to 2017.

Personal life 
Becker is a competitive cyclist. In 2010, he raised $500,000 for Best Buddies on a  ride in California.

References

External links 

Kelley School of Business alumni
American financiers
American chief executives of financial services companies
Cyclists from California
People from Fort Wayne, Indiana

1960s births
Living people
Year of birth uncertain
Silicon Valley people